Yusupha Njie (born 1 March 1994) is a Gambian professional footballer who plays as a forward for Primeira Liga club Boavista and the Gambia national team. He is the son of Biri Biri, who was widely regarded as the greatest Gambian footballer of all time.

Early years
Born in Banjul, Njie began his youth career at local club Wealers FC before switching to Cherno Samba's academy in 2004. In 2007, he was scouted for the national under-15 team; he traveled with them to compete in a cup competition in Norway. Two years later, he underwent a two-week trial with Norwegian club SK Brann, where his half-brother Tijan Jaiteh was playing at the time. Although he impressed team officials, he was not able to return at their request because of obligations with the national under-17 team, including the 2011 African U-17 Championship qualification tournament. He also traveled to Spain for two weeks in 2010 for a trial at his father's former club, Sevilla.

Club career
Njie joined first division Gambian side Real de Banjul in 2011 and spent the following two seasons with them, leading them to a league title in 2012. Their win earned them a spot in the 2013 CAF Champions League, where he was instrumental in their 2–1 second-leg victory over Moroccan club FUS Rabat in the preliminary round. Although they got eliminated on aggregate goals, his play attracted the attention of Rabat manager Jamal Sellami, who, four months later, signed Njie to a four-year contract after a successful trial with the club.

After winning the Moroccan Cup with Rabat in 2014, Njie led them to their first-ever league title in 2015–16. That year, he was voted as Rabat's best player and drew further attention from European clubs. He also scored his second and third career CAF Confederation Cup goals that year, but Rabat eventually lost to Algerian club MO Béjaïa in the semi-finals.

Njie scored the game-winning goal in the second leg of a play-off round match-up against Moroccan rivals MAS Fez during 2017 CAF Confederation Cup qualification. After a 2–1 victory in the first match, Njie scored the second goal in a 1–1 draw to ensure a 3–2 aggregate win, sending them to the group stage. In the first group stage match, Rabat defeated the Ugandan domestic champions, KCCA, by a score of 3–0. Njie contributed with a goal and an assist.

In July 2017, Njie joined Portuguese club Boavista F.C. on a one-year loan, with a buying option in January. He later joined Boavista permanently.

In July 2018, it was reported that Njie had signed with French club Stade de Reims, although the deal was cancelled the following day due to failed medical tests.

International career
Njie made his senior national debut with Gambia on 11 June 2017 in a 2019 Africa Cup of Nations qualifier, coming on for Hamza Barry during a 1–0 defeat to Benin.
He played in the 2021 Africa cup of Nations, his national team's first continental tournament, where they made a sensational quarter-final.

Personal life
In addition to being Biri Biri's son, he is the half-brother of Gambian international footballer Tijan Jaiteh.

Honours
Real de Banjul
 GFA League First Division: 2012
 Gambian Super Cup: 2012

FUS Rabat
 Botola: 2015–16
 Coupe du Trône: 2014; runners-up 2015

References

External links

 
 
 Yusupha Njie at Eurosport

1994 births
Living people
Sportspeople from Banjul
Gambian footballers
The Gambia international footballers
The Gambia youth international footballers
Gambian expatriate footballers
Association football forwards
Real de Banjul FC players
Fath Union Sport players
Boavista F.C. players
Botola players
Primeira Liga players
2021 Africa Cup of Nations players
Gambian expatriate sportspeople in Morocco
Gambian expatriate sportspeople in Portugal
Expatriate footballers in Morocco
Expatriate footballers in Portugal